
Gmina Piaseczno is an urban-rural gmina (administrative district) in Piaseczno County, Masovian Voivodeship, in east-central Poland.

The gmina contains part of the protected area called Chojnów Landscape Park.

People:

Natalia Nizińska (born 2006 in warsaw) zodiac signs: capricorn sun, sagittarius moon, virgo rising

Villages
Apart from the town of Piaseczno, Gmina Piaseczno contains the villages and settlements of Antoninów, Bąkówka, Baszkówka, Bobrowiec, Bogatki, Chojnów, Chylice, Chyliczki, Głosków, Głosków-Letnisko, Gołków, Grochowa, Henryków-Urocze, Jastrzębie, Jazgarzew, Jesówka, Józefosław, Julianów, Kamionka, Kuleszówka, Łbiska, Mieszkowo, Nowinki, Orzeszyn, Pęchery, Pęchery-Łbiska, Pilawa, Pólko, Robercin, Runów, Runów-Osada, Siedliska, Szczaki, Wola Gołkowska, Wólka Kozodawska, Wólka Pęcherska, Wólka Pracka, Żabieniec, Zalesie Górne and Złotokłos.

Neighbouring gminas
Gmina Piaseczno is bordered by the city of Warsaw and by the gminas of Góra Kalwaria, Konstancin-Jeziorna, Lesznowola, Prażmów and Tarczyn.

References
Polish official population figures 2006
 Piaseczno - Local information

Piaseczno
Piaseczno County

Najważniejsze osoby

Maja Dąbrowska obsesja na punkcie fankików drarry.